Radio Progreso is a Cuban Spanish language radio station. Founded on 15 December 1929, it has provided musical and other cultural programmes ever since. Live performances are held in Studio 1 (Estudio Uno) which holds an audience of 300 people. The slogan of Radio Progreso is La Onda de la Alegria ("The Airwave of Happiness").

Frequencies
Shortwave radio listeners can hear Radio Progreso at 4765 kHz at night via its transmitter in Bauta, Cuba. In the southern United States, Radio Progreso can frequently be heard at night on multiple mediumwave (AM frequencies). The following table is taken from an animated banner on Radio Progreso's website with additional information (call sign, power for the AM stations) from the U.S. FCC records which rely on official data that are not necessarily accurate and only partly consistent with Radio Progeso's website.

References

External links
 Radio Progreso online

Radio stations in Cuba
Radio stations established in 1929